Allakaket Airport , is a state-owned public-use airport located two nautical miles (4 km) north-northwest of the central business district of Allakaket, a city in the Yukon-Koyukuk Census Area of the U.S. state of Alaska. The airport is sometimes referred to as the New Allakaket Airport because it was constructed on a site southeast of the original airport which is now closed.

As per Federal Aviation Administration records, this airport had 2,505 passenger boardings (enplanements) in calendar year 2007, an increase of 27% from the 1,969 enplanements in 2006.

Facilities and aircraft 
Allakaket Airport has one runway designated 5/23 with a gravel surface measuring 4,000 by 100 feet (1,219 x 30 m). For the 12-month period ending December 31, 2005, the airport had 2,270 aircraft operations, an average of 189 per month: 53% air taxi, 46% general aviation and 1% military.

Airlines and destinations 

The following airlines offer scheduled passenger service at this airport:

Statistics

References

External links 
 FAA Alaska airport diagram (GIF)
 

Airports in the Yukon–Koyukuk Census Area, Alaska